is a railway station in Aira, Kagoshima, Japan. It is operated by of JR Kyushu and is on the Nippō Main Line.

Lines

Layout 
The station consists of a side platform serving a single track on a low embankment set in a largely residential area. The station building is a simple modern, functional, structure with a canvas roof situated at the base of the embankment and which once housed a kiosk and ticket window but which has since become unstaffed. An automatic ticket vending machine and SUGOCA card readers are provided. There is no waiting area. Next to the station building, a short flight of steps leads up to the platform. Parking is available at the station forecourt. To one side is a large brick-paved plaza where bike sheds have been installed.

Platforms

JR

Adjacent stations

History
The station was opened on 3 March 1986 by Japanese National Railways (JNR) as an additional station on the exiting track of the Nippō Main Line. With the privatization of JNR on 1 April 1987, the station came under the control of JR Kyushu.

In January 2015, JR Kyushu announced that Kinkō would become an unstaffed station from 14 March 2015. This was part of a major effort by the company to reduce its operating deficit by ceasing to staff 32 stations in its network.

Passenger statistics
In fiscal 2016, the station was used by an average of 523 passengers daily (boarding passengers only), and it ranked 240th among the busiest stations of JR Kyushu.

Nearby places
Aira City Kajiki Elementary School
Aira City Kinkō Elementary School

See also
 List of railway stations in Japan

References

External links

Kinkō (JR Kyushu)

Railway stations in Japan opened in 1986
Railway stations in Kagoshima Prefecture